Kalt may refer to:

Place
Kalt, Khuzestan, village in Khuzestan Province, Iran
Kalt, Rhineland-Palatinate, municipality in Rhineland-Palatinate, Germany

People
Brian C. Kalt, American professor of law
Dieter Kalt (born 1974), Austrian ice hockey player
Eugène Kalt (1861–1941), French ophthalmologist
Hans Kalt (1924–2011), Swiss rower 
Joerg Kalt (1967–2007), Austrian film director
Josef Kalt (1920–2012), Swiss rower

Other
KALT-FM, radio station in California, United States